Żmudź may refer to:

Polish name for Samogitia, a region of Lithuania
Żmudź, Lublin Voivodeship, a village in east Poland